Diego Borghini (born 4 March 1997) is an Italian professional footballer who plays as a defender for Serie C club AlbinoLeffe.

Club career

Empoli 
Born in Livorno, Borghini was a youth exponent from Empoli. Here he played 55 matches and scoring 2 goals for their U-19 team. On 31 January 2015 he received his maiden call-up on the bench in a match against Roma in Serie A, however he remained an unused substitute.

Loan to Tuttocuoio 
On 12 July 2016, Borghini was signed by Serie C side Tuttucuoio on a season-long loan deal. On 31 July, Borghini made his debut for Tuttocuoio in a 3–2 away defeat, after extra-time, against Casertana in the first round of Coppa Italia, he played the entire match. On 28 August he made his Serie C debut for Tuttocuoio in a 2–2 away draw against Prato, he played the entire match. On 31 October, Borghini scored his first professional goal in the 93rd minute of a 2–1 away win over Pontedera. On 21 May he was sent off with a double yellow card in the 90th minute of a 2–2 home draw against Prato. Borghini ended his loan to Tuttocuoio with 16 appearances, including 14 as a starter, and 1 assist, but the team was relegated in Serie D.

Loan to Gavorrano 
On 17 July 2017, Borghini was signed by Serie C club Gavorrano on a season-long loan deal. On 27 August he made his Serie C debut for Gavorrano as a substitute replacing Manuele Malotti in the 77th minute of a 2–1 away defeat against Livorno. On 24 September he played his first match as a starter for Gavorrano, a 1–0 away defeat against Prato. On 8 November, Borghini played his first entire match for Gavorrano, a 0–0 home draw against Arezzo. Borghini ended his season-long loan to Gavorrano with 27 appearances, but Gavorrano was relegated in Serie D.

Arezzo 
On 30 August 2018, Borghini joined to Serie C club Arezzo with an undisclosed fee. On 25 September he made his debut as a substitute replacing Carlo Pelagatti in the 60th minute of a 0–0 away draw against Pisa. On 11 November, Borghini played his first entire match for Arezzo, a 2–2 away draw against Novara. On 27 April 2019 he scored his first goal for the club in the 49th minute of a 2–0 home win over Gozzano. One week later, on 4 May he scored the second goal in the third minute of a 3–0 away win over Pistoiese. On 4 August 2019, Borghini played his first match in Coppa Italia for Arezzo, a 1–0 home win over Turris in the first round, and one week later he scored his first goal in this competition in the 10th minute of a 4–3 away defeat against Crotone in the second round.

AlbinoLeffe 
On 1 February 2021, he signed with AlbinoLeffe.

International career 
Borghini represented Italy at Under 18 and Under 19 level. On 19 August 2014, Borghini made his debut at U-18 level and scored his first goal in the 52nd minute of a 2–1 away win over Norway U-18. On 4 March 2015 he played his first and only entire match for Italy U-18, a 4–0 away win over Hungary U-18, six months later, on 12 August, Borghini made his debut at U-19 level as a substitute replacing Federico Dimarco in the 83rd minute of a 2–1 away win over Croatia U-18. On 3 September he played his first entire match for Italy U-19, a 0–0 home draw against Netherlands U-19 and one month later, on 10 September, Borghini played his first competitive international match, a 3–2 home win over North Macedonia U-19 in the 2016 UEFA European Under-19 Championship qualification.

Career statistics

Club

References

External links
 

1997 births
Sportspeople from Livorno
Living people
Italian footballers
Italy youth international footballers
Empoli F.C. players
A.C. Tuttocuoio 1957 San Miniato players
U.S. Gavorrano players
S.S. Arezzo players
U.C. AlbinoLeffe players
Serie C players
Association football defenders
Footballers from Tuscany